Schizocodon is a genus of flowering plants belonging to the family Diapensiaceae.

Its native range is  Southern Central China, Japan.

Species
Species:

Schizocodon ilicifolius 
Schizocodon soldanelloides 
Schizocodon yunnanensis

References

Diapensiaceae
Ericales genera